INS Vajrakosh is a missile and ammunition base of the Indian Navy at Karwar, Karnataka and is the third naval establishment. It was commissioned on 9 September 2015 by the Defence Minister Mr. Manohar Parrikar.

Objective 

INS Vajrakosh serves as a special storage facility for specialized armaments, missiles, ammunition on the Western Sea Board. It is also reportedly able to equip warships and airplanes with ammunition and has an infrastructure providing specialized servicing facilities, for sophisticated missiles and ammunition. 

The commissioning of INS Vajrakosh was believed to allow the Indian Navy to further bolster the offensive and defensive capabilities of its platforms.

See also 
 Indian navy 
 List of Indian Navy bases
 List of active Indian Navy ships
 INS Kadamba, a major naval base on the west coast

 Integrated commands and units
 Armed Forces Special Operations Division
 Defence Cyber Agency
 Integrated Defence Staff
 Integrated Space Cell
 Indian Nuclear Command Authority
 Indian Armed Forces
 Special Forces of India

 Other lists
 Strategic Forces Command
 List of Indian Air Force stations
 List of Indian Navy bases
 India's overseas military bases

References 

Vajra